Omar J. Dorsey (born December 22, 1975) is an American actor.  He has appeared in films The Blind Side (2009), Django Unchained (2012), and Selma (2014) playing James Orange.  In 2016, Dorsey began starring as Hollingsworth "Hollywood" Desonier in the Oprah Winfrey Network drama series Queen Sugar.

Career
Dorsey played small parts in a number of films early in his career, including Juwanna Mann, Starsky & Hutch, and The Blind Side. In 2012, he co-starred in Django Unchained. On television, he guest-starred on ER, The Shield, The Mentalist, Castle, Rizzoli & Isles, and NCIS. He had recurring roles in the Showtime drama Ray Donovan as Cookie Brown, the Fox comedy-drama Rake,  and the HBO comedy Eastbound & Down.

In 2014, Dorsey played Civil Rights Movement activist James Orange in the historical drama film Selma directed by Ava DuVernay. In 2016, DuVernay cast Dorsey in her drama series Queen Sugar for Oprah Winfrey Network. Dorsey appears as Sherriff Barker in the horror films Halloween, Halloween Kills, and Halloween Ends.

Personal life
Dorsey was born in Decatur, Georgia.

He is an alumnus of DeKalb Center for the Performing Arts at Avondale High School. He lives in Los Angeles.

Filmography

Film and TV Movies

Television

References

External links 
 

1975 births
21st-century American male actors
American male film actors
American male television actors
Georgia State University alumni
Living people
Male actors from Georgia (U.S. state)
People from Decatur, Georgia